Asa Elliott (born 17 December 1981) is a British actor and singer. Elliott has appeared in various television and stage productions. He is best known for his appearances in the British sitcom, Benidorm, from 2010 until 2014 and the spin-off stage show Benidorm Live which toured the United Kingdom and Ireland in 2018 and 2019.

He featured in Benidorm from the Christmas special to the sixth series.

Starting his career in 2002, he debuted in the TV show Stars in Their Eyes. He performed as Bobby Vee, singing 'The Night Has A Thousand Eyes'.

In 2007, he featured in the musical, Hello Danny by Jeri Lane Productions.

He has featured in eight pantomimes.

In August 2014, Elliott headlined the UK premiere musical tour of The West End Experience.

In 2018 and 2019 he starred in the UK and Ireland tour of Benidorm Live

In February 2018, he appeared on nationwide US TV screens in PBS's Doo Wop Generations performing "Those Magic Changes" alongside Johnny Contardo and The Modern Gentlemen.

In 2021, during the COVID-19 pandemic, Elliott revealed that he had worked as an Asda delivery driver to supplement his income during lockdown due to lack of work.

References

21st-century British male actors
1981 births
Benidorm (TV series)
Living people
Male actors from Manchester
English people of Scottish descent
21st-century English male actors
British male television actors
British male musical theatre actors